Last Secrets is the final album by indie rock band the Like Young.  It was released in 2006 by Polyvinyl Records.

Track listing
 The Hell With This Whole Affair
 For Money Or Love
 Cold, Cold
 Spell It Out
 Some Closure
 All The Wrong Reasons
 Dead Eyes
 Obviously Desperate
 Writhe Like You Mean It
 Something Fell Through
 Almost Said Yes
 Hard Stress, Soft Skin
 Inner Fantasies

References

2006 albums
The Like Young albums